Sunny Days, Starry Nights is an album by jazz saxophonist Sonny Rollins, released on the Milestone label in 1984, featuring performances by Rollins with Clifton Anderson, Mark Soskin, Russell Blake and Tommy Campbell.

Reception

The Allmusic review by Scott Yanow states: "Sunny Days, Starry Nights as usual finds the great tenor at his best on the two ballads ('I'm Old Fashioned' and Noel Coward's 'I'll See You Again') while the other four originals have been largely forgotten." Music critic Robert Christgau called the album "His most accessible and uncompromised album in more than a decade is soaked in the swinging pan-Caribbean 'calypso' that's been his special pleasure since the '50s..."

Track listing
All compositions by Sonny Rollins except as indicated
 "Mava Mava" - 4:34  
 "I'm Old Fashioned" (Jerome Kern, Johnny Mercer) - 6:28  
 "Wynton" - 8:20  
 "Tell Me You Love Me" - 6:16  
 "I'll See You Again" (Noël Coward) - 6:21  
 "Kilauea" - 6:59
Recorded at Fantasy Studios, Berkeley, CA, on January 23–27, 1984

Personnel
Sonny Rollins - tenor saxophone
Clifton Anderson - trombone 
Mark Soskin - piano, electric piano, celesta, synthesizer
Russell Blake - electric bass
Tommy Campbell - drums 
Lucille Rollins - cowbell (tracks 1 & 6)

References

1984 albums
Milestone Records albums
Sonny Rollins albums